Leszek Roman Cichy (born 14 November 1951), is a Polish mountaineer, geodesist, financier, and entrepreneur. He was born in Pruszków, Poland on November 14, 1951. He is best known for making the first winter ascent of Mount Everest together with Krzysztof Wielicki in 1980 which established the winter ascent record of 8,848 meters. He was also the first Polish climber to complete the Seven Summits and a number of other prestigious climbs.

References

1951 births
Living people
Polish mountain climbers
Summiters of the Seven Summits
Polish summiters of Mount Everest
People from Pruszków
Sportspeople from Masovian Voivodeship